A backsword is a type of sword characterised by having a single-edged blade and a hilt with a single-handed grip. It is so called because the triangular cross section gives a flat back edge opposite the cutting edge. Later examples often have a "false edge" on the back near the tip, which was in many cases sharpened to make an actual edge and facilitate thrusting attacks. From around the early 14th century, the backsword became the first type of European sword to be fitted with a knuckle guard.

The term "backsword" can also refer to the singlestick, which is used to train for fighting with the backsword, or to the sport or art of fighting in this fashion. Backswording was an alternative term for singlesticking tournaments in England.

Being easier and cheaper to make than double-edged swords, backswords became the favored sidearm of common infantry, including irregulars such as the Highland Scots, which in Scottish Gaelic were called the claidheamh cuil (back sword), after one of several terms for the distinct types of weapons they used. Backswords were often the secondary weapons of European cavalrymen beginning in the 17th century.

See also
Classifications of swords
Types of swords
List of swords

Basket-hilted swords
Cutlass
Dusack
Falchion
Golok
Machete
Messer
Parang
Sabre
Shamshir
Szabla
Shashka

Citations

General references 

 Dwelly's Illustrated Gaelic to English Dictionary. Glasgow: Gairm Publications, 1988, p. 202
 Culloden: the swords and the sorrows. Glasgow: The National Trust for Scotland, 1996

Further reading
 Włodzimierz Kwaśniewicz, Leksykon broni białej i miotającej, Warsaw: Varsavia, 2003.
 Pierre Goubert & Maarten Ultee, The Course of French History, London: Routledge, 1991.
 Philippe Contamine, War in the Middle Ages, Oxford: Blackwell, 1984 
 R. G. Allanson-Winn & C. Phillipps-Wolley, Broad-sword and Single-stick: with chapters on quarter-staff, bayonet, cudgel, shillalah, walking-stick, umbrella, and other weapons of self-defence (All-England Series.) London: George Bell, 1890.

Early Modern European swords
Renaissance-era swords
Single-edged swords

pl:Pałasz